Jabal Al Rihane Biosphere Reserve is an area of protected "evergreen sclerophylic broussailles and forests" in Lebanon. It includes several peaks between 1,200 and 1,360 meters high, was declared in 2007, and covers 18,430 ha. It is administered by the Ministry of Environment.

Latitude 33° 27′ 01.17″ N; Longitude 35° 33′ 47.17″ E. It is bordered by the Litani River to the south, Mzairaa in the north, and the Jezzine and Niha villages. Parts of the preserve overlook the Beqaa Valley to the east and the Mediterranean Sea to the west.

References

Biosphere reserves of Lebanon